El Consejo is a city in the state of Aragua, Venezuela. It is the shire town of the José Rafael Revenga Municipality.

Cities in Aragua